Mark Emery Udall (born July 18, 1950) is an American politician who served as a United States Senator from Colorado from 2009 to 2015. A member of the Democratic Party, he previously served in the United States House of Representatives, representing . Prior to being elected to Congress, he represented parts of Boulder, Colorado in the Colorado House of Representatives.

Throughout his career he has proposed legislation to support renewable energy, expand national parks and protect natural resources. Born in Tucson, Arizona, he is the son of former U.S. Representative Mo Udall and the nephew of former U.S. Representative Stewart Udall. A member of the Udall family, a western American political family, his relatives include New Mexico's Tom Udall and Utah's Mike Lee. Udall ran for reelection in 2014 to a second term in the U.S. Senate, but was narrowly defeated by Republican challenger Cory Gardner.

Early life and education

Udall attended and graduated from Canyon del Oro High School in 1968, where he was elected student body president. Udall won the Arizona State Golf Championship Boy's division in 1968.

Udall later graduated from Williams College in 1972 with a Bachelor of Arts in American civilization. In 1976 Udall worked as a field coordinator for his father's campaign to win the Democratic nomination against Jimmy Carter.

After college, Udall moved to Colorado and began his career with Outward Bound, a non-profit outdoor education organization. For ten years Udall worked as a course instructor, in which he would bring patrons on outdoor expeditions. During his career in Outdoor Adventure Education he also was an instructor at DoDDS's Project Bold, located at the Hinterbrand Lodge in Berchtesgaden, Germany. Afterward, Udall served as Outward Bound's Executive Director for ten years, after which Udall decided to retire, completing his twenty-year career with Outward Bound.

Colorado House of Representatives
In 1996, Udall was encouraged to run for the Colorado House of Representatives by Peggy Lamm of the 13th district, who had decided to retire. After running a grassroots campaign in the swing district, Udall narrowly defeated Republican Drew Bolin to represent the Longmont and Boulder district. During his two years in office, Udall served on the Judiciary and Agriculture Livestock & Natural Resources Committees.

While in the Colorado House, Udall proposed legislation titled "Renewable Electricity Standard." It would have required at least 10% of energy consumed in Colorado to be provided by renewable sources rather than fossil fuels. The bill died in committee. Udall chose not to run for re-election, instead decided to run for the United States Congress. He was succeeded by fellow Democrat, Tom Plant.

U.S. House of Representatives

Elections
After one term in the Colorado House of Representatives, Udall opted to run for Colorado's 2nd congressional district, which was being vacated by incumbent David Skaggs. In the primary, Udall had four opponents: Gene Nichol, Paul Weissmann, and Dave Thomas. He won with 44% of the vote, defeating his closest opponent Nichol by 7 percentage points. He faced the Republican nominee, Boulder, Colorado Mayor Bob Greenlee in the general election. The race was unexpectedly close, with Udall narrowly winning, 49-47%. Udall was consecutively elected to five terms in the House, without major opposition. He was eventually succeeded by Jared Polis, after he decided to run for the Senate seat being vacated by retiring Republican Wayne Allard.

U.S. Senate

Elections
2004

In 2004, Udall announced his candidacy for the Senate seat which was being vacated by Ben Nighthorse Campbell. However, the following day, Colorado Attorney General Ken Salazar announced his candidacy as well. Udall bowed out of the race and endorsed Salazar.
 
2008

On January 15, 2007, incumbent Senator Wayne Allard announced he would not run for a third term. In April 2007, Udall announced his campaign for the Senate. Udall became the Democratic nominee for the race after running unopposed in the primary. In the general election, Udall faced former U.S. Representative Republican Bob Schaffer. By August 28, 2008, over $10 million had been spent on attack ads against Udall by political parties and political action committees, an amount higher than in any other Senate race that year.

The race was especially competitive, with Democrats wanting to expand their majority as much as possible due to that year's presidential election. While both CQ Politics and The Rothenberg Political Report estimated Udall would win, and The Cook Political Report considered it a 'Toss Up,' Udall maintained a steady lead in the polls, but with neither candidate usually topping 50%. Udall described the race as "the toughest climb I've ever taken." On November 4, Udall won the election with 52% of the vote.

2014

On January 7, 2013, Udall announced he was running for re-election. Udall was unopposed in the Democratic primary, and faced Republican U.S. Representative Cory Gardner in the general election.  Although Udall was heavily favored in early polls, around September, Gardner gained and held a steady lead thereafter.

Udall's re-election campaign focused on reproductive and women's rights. Throughout, Udall attacked Gardner for his former support of a fetal personhood initiative, and claimed in ads that Gardner "championed an eight-year crusade to outlaw birth control here in Colorado." PolitiFact.com rated his claim "half-true," saying that it "leaves out important details." On MSNBC's The Last Word, Alex Wagner attributed Udall's trailing poll numbers to his "focus on reproductive rights." Due to his campaign's emphasis on these issues, Udall was ridiculed as "Mark Uterus." In an October 2014 Denver Post endorsement of his opponent, the editorial board stated that "Udall's campaign has devoted a shocking amount of energy and money trying to convince voters that Gardner seeks to outlaw birth control despite the congressman's call for over-the-counter sales of contraceptives. Udall is trying to frighten voters rather than inspire them with a hopeful vision."

Towards the end of his campaign, Udall was accompanied by Second Lady of the United States Jill Biden, Massachusetts Senator Elizabeth Warren, and former Secretary of State Hillary Clinton. In July 2014, President Barack Obama headlined a fundraiser for Udall's campaign.

Senate tenure
Less than one month after Udall took office in the Senate, newly elected President Obama nominated senior Colorado Senator Ken Salazar to serve as his Secretary of the Interior. After his confirmation, Udall became the Senate's most junior senior Senator.

Committee assignments
 Committee on Armed Services
 Subcommittee on Emerging Threats and Capabilities 
 Subcommittee on Readiness and Management Support
 Subcommittee on Strategic Forces (Chairman)
 Committee on Energy and Natural Resources
 Subcommittee on Energy
 Subcommittee on National Parks (Chairman)
 Subcommittee on Public Lands and Forests
 Select Committee on Intelligence

Political positions

Abortion
NARAL Pro-Choice America gives Udall a 100% rating for abortion rights, while his opponent in 2014, Cory Gardner, earned a 0% rating.

Agriculture
In February 2014, Udall voted for the Federal Agriculture Reform and Risk Management Act of 2013, a $1 trillion bill that ended direct payments to farmers but expanded crop insurance by $7 billion over the next decade,  created new subsidies for rice and peanut growers that will kick in if or when prices drop, and cut food stamp subsidies for 1.7 million people in 15 states.

In 2011, Maine Senator Susan Collins and Udall successfully introduced an amendment to the Senate’s agriculture appropriations bill. The amendment to the appropriations bill removed a limit placed on potatoes in the USDA new school nutrition guidelines.

Campaign finance reform
Udall is a member of the ReFormers Caucus of Issue One, a bipartisan organization dedicated to reducing the influence of money in politics.

Cannabis

Although Senator to the first state to legalize the recreational sale of marijuana, Udall took no official stance on Colorado Amendment 64 during its campaign. After Amendment 64 and Washington state's similar initiative passed in 2012, Udall and the Senate delegations from Washington addressed a letter to Attorney General Eric Holder and White House Chief of Staff Denis McDonough, imploring them to "let this experiment unfold," as Udall characterized it.

Domestic security
Udall has been an opponent of the National Security Agency's (NSA) mass surveillance programs. Following the revelation of the NSA's mass surveillance of Americans, Udall has been an advocate for reform. Udall, along with Senators Ron Wyden and Rand Paul, published an Op-ed in the Los Angeles Times expressing their collective desire to "end the dragnet — and to affirm that we can keep our nation secure without trampling on and abandoning Americans' constitutional rights." Udall expressed his support for Edward Snowden to return to America to "make his case." After reports that the Central Intelligence Agency improperly spied on U.S. Senators, Udall called for the resignation of Agency Director John O. Brennan.

After the September 11 attacks, the one-term Representative Udall was one of 66 House members to vote against the Patriot Act. In 2011, Udall voted against reauthorizing the Patriot Act. In July 2014, Udall voted against the CISPA bill, a proposed law which would allow for the sharing of Internet traffic information between the U.S. government and technology and manufacturing companies, voicing his concerns that it "lacks adequate protections for the privacy rights."

During the 2011 debate over the National Defense Authorization Act for Fiscal Year 2012 (NDAA), Udall introduced an amendment to end the practice of military detention of American citizens indefinitely and without trial. In response to the amendment's introduction, the Obama administration threatened to veto the bill. The amendment was rejected by a vote of 60–38 (with 2 abstaining). Udall subsequently voted for the Act in the joint session of Congress that passed it, and though he remained "extremely troubled" by the detainee provisions, he promised to "push Congress to conduct the maximum amount of oversight possible".

Udall has supported PRISM, a clandestine anti-terrorism mass electronic surveillance data mining program launched in 2007 by the National Security Agency (NSA); however, he has also expressed support for introduction of measures to reform and limit the scope of the Patriot Act; 'The Patriot Act should be reformed so Americans' phone records do not get indiscriminately swept up in a federal government database.'

Economy
Udall voted for the Employee Free Choice Act in 2007, which would have eliminated secret ballot in voting to unionize businesses, and said that he supported the measure because the National Labor Relations Board would be the best forum to deal with concerns raised by the bill's opponents.

On February 13, 2009, Udall voted to pass the American Recovery and Reinvestment Act of 2009 (commonly referred to as The Stimulus or The Recovery Act).

In December 2010, Udall was one of seven Democrats to vote against a deal to extend the Bush tax cuts for two years as well as fund unemployment benefits for an additional 13 months, having stated, "Days after the most substantive national conversation we've had about addressing the debt, the debate suddenly has turned to extending tax breaks for millionaires and billionaires that — alone — will cost $700 billion over the next decade."

Energy and environment
Udall has supported tax breaks for renewable energy and the expansion of national parks. Udall has a lifetime rating of 97% from the League of Conservation Voters.

In 2004, Udall helped lead a statewide ballot initiative (Amendment 37) to adopt the Renewable Electricity Standard, a standard he originally introduced in the Colorado House of Representatives. Working with the Republican Colorado House Speaker, the measure mandating 10% of energy consumed be from renewable sources, passed by a close margin 52% to 48%.

Throughout his career Udall has introduced the "Ski Area Recreational Opportunity Enhancement Act," which was passed in 2011. The act allows ski resorts to offer activities in the summer. In 2009, Udall introduced legislation to address the environmental damage caused by the pine beetle infestation in Colorado's forests, in what Udall described as one of the "biggest natural disasters."

In July 2014, Udall came out in opposition of two Colorado ballot initiative that would have limited hydraulic fracturing, or "fracking", and created an "Environmental Bill of Rights." While his opposition to the initiative aligned him Colorado Governor John Hickenlooper, it put him at odds with the main proponent of the bills and his House district successor, Jared Polis. Udall has repeatedly voted against the Keystone XL pipeline, having said that he wants to wait until a technical review of the project by the State Department is complete.

Gun policy
One week after the Sandy Hook Elementary School shooting, Colorado Senators Udall and Michael Bennet came out in support of a Federal Assault Weapons Ban. On the issue, Udall commented "if we can save one child in the future from being killed in such a way, I'm ready to push those kinds of policies." On April 17, 2013 Udall supported a failed amendment to expand background checks for gun purchases.

In 2009, Udall upset gun control advocates for supporting an amendment that would have allowed concealed weapons to be transported across state lines. The National Rifle Association gave an "F" grade during his time in the House of Representatives. While during his tenure in the Senate, they have given him a "C".

Health policy
In December 2009, Udall voted for the Patient Protection and Affordable Care Act. Udall has also stated his support for a public option about which he stated, "[t]he reason I support a public option, if it's done in a fiscally responsible way, is it would create competition. Competition drives down cost and what we want to do is make insurance affordable for all Americans."

In November 2013, Udall was critical of the Colorado Division of Insurance concerning the Division's estimates of the number of Colorado residents whose medical insurance was cancelled in response to the requirements of the Affordable Care Act. Udall's office wanted the Division to lower the number from 250,000 because it believed the majority of individuals counted had received renewal options. The Division refused to change the numbers. Administrators at the Colorado Division of Insurance said they felt pressured by members of Udall's staff to change their estimates of policy cancellations. A panel which investigated the matter concluded Udall's office behaved appropriately, however the investigation was criticized because the chair was appointed by Democratic governor John Hickenlooper; all other members of the panel were selected by the chair, who refused to name the other members of the panel, and left no written records of its investigation.

Personal life
Udall is married to Maggie Fox, an environmental lawyer who previously served as CEO of The Climate Reality Project. The two met while working at Outward Bound, and were married in 1982. They have two children, Jedediah and Tess. A golfer, Udall was referred to as one of Congress' better players.

Udall has said "there isn't a Coloradan out there who doesn't cycle, hunt, hike... We're an outdoor state. It fits our worldview, and it's how we define ourselves." An experienced mountaineer, Udall has climbed many peaks during his work as an Outward Bound instructor, and in his personal life. Udall has climbed Colorado's 100 tallest peaks, known as "The Colorado Centennials," as well as Kangchenjunga in the Himalayas and Aconcagua, the highest peak in South America. He has also attempted Mount Everest multiple times.

In 1986, Udall and his wife went on a group trek of Mount Garmo. During the climb, Maggie broke her leg, and their fellow climber, Steve Monfredo, died on the mountainside. Udall's 61-year-old brother, Randy Udall, went missing on June 26, 2013, after going on a solo hike in Wyoming's Wind River Range. On July 3, 2013 a body, later identified as that of Randy Udall, was found approximately 80 miles southeast of Grand Teton National Park.

Electoral history

See also
 Udall family
 Lee-Hamblin family
 Kennedy family

References

Further reading
 Make It Fuller: A Conversation with Congressman Mark Udall Elephant, summer 2005 interview

External links 

 Senator Mark Udall official U.S. Senate website (archived)
 Mark Udall for Colorado 

 
 Udall Family of Arizona  at the Political Graveyard
 

|-

|-

|-

1950 births
21st-century American politicians
American mountain climbers
Democratic Party members of the United States House of Representatives from Colorado
Democratic Party United States senators from Colorado
Living people
Democratic Party members of the Colorado House of Representatives
Politicians from Denver
Politicians from Tucson, Arizona
Udall family
Williams College alumni